Dufek Massif, Augusto Pinochet Massif or Santa Teresita Massif is a rugged, largely snow-covered massif  long, standing west of the Forrestal Range in the northern part of the Pensacola Mountains. It was discovered and photographed on January 13, 1956, on a transcontinental patrol plane flight of U.S. Navy Operation Deep Freeze from McMurdo Sound to the vicinity of the Weddell Sea and return, and named by the Advisory Committee on Antarctic Names for Rear Admiral George J. Dufek, U.S. Navy, who was in direct operational command of U.S. Navy Task Force 43 during that operation. The entire Pensacola Mountains were mapped by the U.S. Geological Survey in 1967 and 1968 from ground surveys and U.S. Navy tricamera aerial photographs taken in 1964.

Features
Geographical features include:

Boyd Escarpment

Other features

 Alley Spur
 Aughenbaugh Peak
 Brown Nunataks
 Cairn Ridge
 Carlson Buttress
 Clemons Spur
 Clinton Spur
 Czamanske Ridge
 Davis Valley
 Edge Glacier
 Enchanted Valley
 England Peak
 Ford Ice Piedmont
 Forlidas Pond
 Forlidas Ridge
 Foundation Ice Stream
 Frost Spur
 Hannah Peak
 Jaburg Glacier
 Jaeger Table
 Kelley Spur
 Kistler Valley
 Lewis Spur
 Neuburg Peak
 Nutt Bluff
 Petite Rocks
 Preslik Spur
 Pyroxenite Promontory
 Rautio Nunatak
 Sallee Snowfield
 Sapp Rocks
 Spear Spur
 The Organ Pipes (Antarctica)
 Tranquillity Valley
 Walker Peak
 Welcome Pass
 Worcester Summit
 Wujek Ridge

Notes

References

Mountain ranges of Queen Elizabeth Land
Pensacola Mountains